Stephen Harvey (1879-1933) was an English-born architect in Townsville, Queensland, Australia. A number of his works are now heritage-listed.

Early life 
Stephen Harvey was born in Sussex, England in 1879, the son of Stephen Harvey and his wife Alice Jane (née Taylor).

He immigrated to Australia with his family in 1912–13. A joiner by trade, he had completed drawing and construction courses, and became an instructor in drawing for the Sussex County Council.

Architectural career 
After working for an architect Harvey began practicing in the early 1900s. Upon arrival in Australia, he worked in Toowoomba for two years before moving to Townsville. During his career in Townsville, Harvey was a well-known local architect who worked on a variety of civic and commercial projects.

Later life 
Harvey died in Townsville on 1 March 1933.

Significant works 
 Mackay Cenotaph (1922)
 Townsville Town Hall
 Townsville Masonic Temple (completed after his death).

References

Attribution 
This Wikipedia article was originally based on "The Queensland heritage register" published by the State of Queensland under CC-BY 3.0 AU licence, accessed on 7 July 2014, archived published by the State of Queensland under CC-BY 3.0 AU licence (accessed on 7 July 2014, archived on 8 October 2014). The geo-coordinates were originally computed from the "Queensland heritage register boundaries" published by the State of Queensland under CC-BY 3.0 AU licence, accessed on 5 September 2014, archived published by the State of Queensland under CC-BY 3.0 AU licence (accessed on 5 September 2014, archived on 15 October 2014).

Architects from Queensland
1879 births
1933 deaths
British emigrants to Australia
People from Townsville